A Disneyland social club is an organized group of Disneyland fans who express their fandom by wearing matching jackets or vests bearing back patch designs that are reminiscent of motorcycle clubs. Although they borrow certain aesthetic traits of motorcycle club subculture, Disneyland social clubs are not gangs and have been dubbed by OC Weekly as "The Very Merry Un-Gangs of Disneyland." Hugo Martín reported the social clubs to be harmless groups of friends, family, and children gathering at the theme parks to have fun, enjoy each other's company, and to share a geeky enthusiasm for all things Disney.  Every club has their own membership requirements and guidelines, but most seem to adhere to following all Disney Parks rules, cooperating with cast members, being courteous and friendly, and being respectful of the park itself.

History 
The current wave of Disneyland social clubs is not the first time that youth groups and social clubs have been present at Disneyland. On August 6, 1970, hundreds of Yippies conquered Tom Sawyer Island, climbed the Main Street flag pole, blocked major thoroughfares, got into fights with park guests, security and police, and forced an early, unexpected closure.  The late 1990s saw an influx of local Southern California teenagers following the introduction of more youth-centric attractions and the low cost of an annual pass.

The first of this current wave of Disneyland social club was The Black Death Crew, which began on March 29, 2012 as a group of friends wearing all black clothing to Disneyland in Anaheim, California. However The Neverlanders Social Club, founded in October 2012, are believed to be the first patched social club to wear jackets/vests bearing back patches.  They were followed by The Hitchhikers Social Club which was founded in February 2013 and The Main Street Elite Social Club, which was founded in early 2013.

The first known reference to Disneyland social clubs appeared on an April 17, 2013 Internet forum post on MiceChat.com.

The presence of those first patched club members wandering the parks created a style that other groups quickly copied. Subsequently, the number of patched Disneyland social clubs grew and by March 2014 there were over 20 social clubs in existence.  Coincidentally, in July 2013 the Disney Channel premiered a Disney Channel Original Movie entitled Teen Beach Movie which features a group of motorcycle bikers calling themselves "The Rodents Social Club" who wear matching motorcycle jackets emblazoned with their club name and a picture of a mouse.

Identifying traits 
Each Disneyland social club bears a unique name, usually in an homage to some form of Disney franchise (e.g. theme park attractions, movies, TV shows, etc.) and each club has its own leather jacket, jean jacket, varsity letterman jacket, or vest which bears custom-made patches of their mascot logo and club name on the back.  The jacket/vest fronts may feature the member's name and their favorite character or attraction, as well as Disney trading pins.

As of 2017, over 100 patched social clubs have been founded by Disney Parks fans.

Controversy 
In a lawsuit filed on Sept. 11, 2017 in Orange County Superior Court, John Sarno, the founder of the Main Street Fire Station 55 Social Club, claims he was bullied and terrorized by members of the White Rabbits Social Club.  Sarno accuses members of the White Rabbits of cyberbullying, defamation through false statements, invasion of medical privacy, infliction of emotional distress, and causing Leslee Sarno to lose her job. John and Leslee Sarno organized a September 11 attacks benefit memorial walk in 2016.  A week before the event, John Sarno claims Jakob Fite and four other members of the White Rabbits Social Club approached him, demanding $500 protection money. Sarno refused to pay, claims that Fite and others have since cyberbullied him with malicious rumors on podcasts and social media sites that are frequented by other Disneyland social clubs. Sarno also alleges that Fite attempted to make him and his wife appear to be drug addicts by hacking into their confidential medical files and publishing the medications that were prescribed to them by their physicians, a violation of federal HIPAA privacy laws. Sarno also sued Kaiser Foundation Health Plan claiming that Kaiser failed to protect his medical information, and sued Disneyland saying the park took “no steps to stop the White Rabbits’ malicious conduct.” As a result of this controversy, John Sarno has disbanded his social club and shut down its website, and Disneyland has declined to permit further memorial walks.

See also 
 Dapper Day
 D23-Official Disney fan club
 Disney adults
 Disneyana

References

External links 
 Disney Bounding
 Social Clubs of Disneyland

Clubs and societies in the United States
Disney fandom
Disneyland
Film fan clubs
Television fan clubs
Animation fan clubs
Comics fan clubs